Helmuth Jacobo Martinez Llancapan (born 1987) is a Chilean lawyer who was elected as a member of the Chilean Constitutional Convention.

On 14 August 2021, it was reported that he resigned to The List of the People alongside Camila Zárate.

References

External links
Profile at Lista del Pueblo

Living people
1987 births
21st-century Chilean lawyers
21st-century Chilean politicians
Members of the List of the People
Members of the Chilean Constitutional Convention
Temuco Catholic University alumni